Queensland Actors Equity Awards are a peer awards which recognise excellence in all forms of theatre in Queensland.

The awards are voted by members of Actors Equity / Media, Entertainment and Arts Alliance (MEAA). 
All members of MEAA who have performed in Queensland are eligible to be nominated.
The inaugural awards were given out at a ceremony at the Merthyr Bowls Club in December 2006 hosted by David Knijnenburg.

See also
Performing arts in Australia

Australian theatre awards
Theatre acting awards